Berlandieri, a word referring to French naturalist Jean-Louis Berlandier (1803 – 1851), may refer to:

Senegalia berlandieri, a species of shrub
Gopherus berlandieri or the Texas tortoise
Lycium berlandieri, a species of plant in the nightshade family
Rana berlandieri or Rio Grande leopard frog
Vitis berlandieri, a species of grape

See also
C. berlandieri (disambiguation)